Warren State Hospital is a public psychiatric hospital in Warren, Pennsylvania, established in 1880. The original hospital was designed by John McArthur, Jr. and constructed under the Kirkbride Plan. Its population peaked at 2,562 residents in 1947. As of 2022, the hospital is still active.

Residents included Nictzin Dyalhis’s first wife and Joe Root. Known staff included Penny Colman’s father and  Philipp Schwartz.

See also
 Jamestown Community College
 List of hospitals in Pennsylvania

References

Further reading

1880 establishments in Pennsylvania
Hospitals in Pennsylvania
Kirkbride Plan hospitals
Hospitals established in 1880